Vyalikaval is a locality in Bangalore City. It is surrounded by Palace Orchards, Guttahalli, Kodandarampura, Palace Guttahalli, and Sankey road cross localities. Malleshwaram railway station is 2 km from Vyalikaval. It is 30 km from Bangalore International Airport. It is connected by BMTC (Bangalore Metropolitan Transport Corporation). Bus stops nearby are Sudhindra Nagar, Malleshwaram 11th Cross, Vyalikaval, Rajmahal Guttahalli, Malleshwaram Circle. The buses which pass through Vayyalikaval are the 100, 104, 266R, 258L, 266H, 258VF, 266K, 258TA, 263J, 258V, 258VA, 262A, 256G, 253P, 258YA. It is 5 km distance from Shivajinagar Bus terminus. And it is 5 km distance from K R Market Bus terminus.

Location

Neighbourhoods in Bangalore